Fernanda Botelho may refer to:
 Fernanda Botelho (writer)
 Fernanda Botelho (mathematician)